Sandran River takes birth near sarbal pass in the south eastern border areas of Kashmir Valley and flowing to the north west empties into Jhelum River along with Arapath River and Brengi River near Anantnag town. From this point downstream Jhelum River turns into a full-fledged river.

Course
The Sandran river flows into the Jhelum River at Takia Bahram Shah, in Khanabal. It flows through areas such as Dooru Shahabad and Sadura, and covers a distance of 43.50 kilometers.

References

Rivers of Jammu and Kashmir
Rivers of India